St Francis Football Club  is an Irish association football club originally based in The Liberties in Dublin. They played in the League of Ireland First Division from 1996–97 until 2000–01. They currently play in the Leinster Senior League and operate a number of schoolboy and women's teams.  The club wear green and white hooped shirts.

History

Early years
St Francis was founded by John Hyland and friends in 1958 initially as a schoolboy club. In 1968, the first adult side was introduced as St Francis joined the Athletic Union League, winning division 2A in their first season.  In their second season St Francis won the FAI Junior Cup, the highest honour for junior sides.  The club progressed into the intermediate ranks and soon become one of the top teams at that grade, winning the Leinster Senior League four times.  In 1989–90 St Francis became the first non-League of Ireland side to reach an FAI Cup Final in over 50 years before finally losing to Bray Wanderers. Their fairytale story, combined with the final moving to Lansdowne Road saw a crowd of over 33,000 witness the historic final.

League of Ireland years
St Francis continued to be one of the top Leinster Senior League sides and when St. James's Gate were expelled from the League of Ireland First Division, St Francis were invited to apply along with two other clubs to take their place. The club's first senior game was a drab drawn tie against Longford Town in the League of Ireland Cup. Their first League of Ireland game ended in a 4–0 defeat to Waterford United on 11 October 1996.

St Francis struggled to make an impact in the League of Ireland First Division.  Both their traditional Liberties home and their adopted home of Clondalkin are areas which St Patrick's Athletic claim many fans from, and St Francis's crowds were small, even by First Division standards.  In their five seasons in the league, St Francis never finished out of the bottom three.  After finishing bottom for the third time in the 2000–01, director Alan Duncan approached St. Patrick's Athletic with a view to merging. St Pats managing director Pat Dolan was receptive to the idea and two weeks before the 2001–02 season, St Francis withdrew from the league. A  hurriedly arranged joint press conference was called to announce the arrival of the Dublin Saints after the proposed merger was revealed on a website. St. Pats fans were outraged as their club announced plans to call the club St Patrick's Athletic including St Francis F.C..  In a meeting with St Francis supporters, Duncan spoke of his wish that the new club be officially renamed the Dublin Saints.  As the season progressed, the merger talks broke down and the merger never materialised.  Pats did use John Hyland Park for some friendlies and for underage games, but the ground was never in their possession as it was held in trust for use by St Francis only.

After the League of Ireland
St Francis did not field an adult team in 2001–02. However they regrouped and subsequently re-entered the Leinster Senior League.

John Hyland Park
St Francis play their home games at John Hyland Park in Baldonnel, close to Clondalkin.

Honours
Leinster Senior League
Winners: 1989–90, 1991–92, 1992–93, 1995–96: 4
FAI Junior Cup
Winners:1968–69, 1982–83: 2
FAI Cup
Runners up: 1989–90: 1

References

External links
Official St Francis Football Club website
"'You can't lose, you'll make the league look bad'", RTÉ Sport, 13 May 2020.

 
1958 establishments in Ireland
Association football clubs established in 1958
Association football clubs in South Dublin (county)
Former Athletic Union League (Dublin) clubs
Former League of Ireland clubs
Leinster Senior League (association football) clubs